The Manitoba Derby is a Canadian Thoroughbred horse race run annually at the beginning of August at Assiniboia Downs in Winnipeg, Manitoba, Canada. A nongraded stakes race for three-year-olds, it is contested on dirt over a distance of  miles (9 furlongs).

Winners since 1998

References
 The Manitoba Derby at Pedigree query
 The Manitoba Derby at Assiniboia Downs
 Wilson, Keith & Lussier, Antoine S. Off And Running - Horse Racing in Manitoba (1978) Peguis Publishers Limited  (See: University of Calgary)

Horse races in Canada
Ungraded stakes races in Canada
Flat horse races for three-year-olds
Sports competitions in Winnipeg
Recurring events established in 1930
1930 establishments in Manitoba
Summer events in Canada